Eyemen Samir Henaini (born May 4, 1984 in Saint-Raphaël) is a French football player of Algerian origin who plays for Cannet Rocheville.

Personal
Born in France, Henaini's family is originally from the city of Chlef in Algeria.

Club career
On January 24, 2007, he made his Sedan Ligue 1 debut against Sochaux

On July 6, 2010, Henaini was loaned out to Championnat National side ES Frejus for the 2010-2011 season.

On July 15, 2011, Henaini joined Dubai Club in the UAE Pro-League.

References

External links

1984 births
Living people
People from Saint-Raphaël, Var
French sportspeople of Algerian descent
Algerian footballers
French footballers
ÉFC Fréjus Saint-Raphaël players
CS Sedan Ardennes players
Paris FC players
Ligue 1 players
Ligue 2 players
Championnat National players
Championnat National 2 players
AC Arlésien players
CS Constantine players
SR Colmar players
Amiens SC players
Algerian Ligue Professionnelle 1 players
Association football forwards
Sportspeople from Var (department)
Footballers from Provence-Alpes-Côte d'Azur